Mahesh Joshi (born 14 September 1954) is an Indian politician belonging to the Indian National Congress. He was elected to the 15th Lok Sabha, lower house of the Parliament of India from Jaipur constituency, Rajasthan in 2009. He was elected as MLA from Hawa Mahal (Vidhan Sabha constituency) in 2018 Rajasthan Legislative Assembly election. In 2019 he was appointed Chief Whip in Rajasthan Legislative Assembly Cabinet minister rank.

References

Indian National Congress politicians
Living people
1954 births
India MPs 2009–2014
Politicians from Jaipur
Lok Sabha members from Rajasthan
Rajasthan MLAs 2018–2023
Indian National Congress politicians from Rajasthan